The New Formula is a studio album released in 1990 by American R&B group Today. The album was the group's second album, and included the single "I Got the Feeling", along with a remix of "Why You Get Funky on Me", a #2 single which first appeared on the soundtrack for the film House Party, released earlier in the year.  The album spent 27 weeks on Billboard's Top R&B/Hip-Hop Albums chart and peaked at #19 on November 24, 1990.

Track listing

Personnel

Frederick Lee "Bubba" Drakeford – vocals
Larry "Chief" Singeltary – vocals
Larry "Love" McCain – vocals
Wesley "Wes" Adams - vocals
Bernard Belle – producer
Dae Bennett – engineer
Alan Gregorie – mixing, remixing
Timmy Regisford – mixing, remixing
Dennis Mitchell – engineer, mixing
Gene Williams – keyboard programming
Georg "Jojje" Wadenius – electric guitar
Stanley Brown – associate producer, bass, keyboards
Troy Taylor – drum programming, keyboards, percussion, piano, synthesizer bass
Buddy Williams – drums

References

1990 albums
Today (group) albums
Motown albums
MCA Records albums
Albums produced by Troy Taylor